John Merrill Olin (November 10, 1892 – September 8, 1982) was an American businessman and philanthropist. He was the son of Franklin W. Olin.

Early life
Born in Alton, Illinois, Olin graduated from Cornell University with a B.Sc. degree in chemistry and as a brother of the Kappa Sigma Fraternity and was a founding member of the Alpha Chi Sigma fraternity Tau chapter. With major financial contributions to the School of Business and the Olin Library at Washington University in St. Louis, both buildings were named after him.  In addition, the Olin Library at Cornell University bears his name, as does a classroom building, Olin Hall, at Johns Hopkins University, and Olin-Sang Hall at Brandeis University.

He married twice. By his first wife, the former Adele Levis, a granddaughter of the founder of Illinois Glass Company, he had two daughters, Adele Louise and Georgene. With his second wife, Evelyn Brown, he had one stepdaughter, Evelyn.

Business
Olin started his career in 1913 as a chemical engineer for his father's Western Cartridge Company, a predecessor of Olin Industries, Inc. In 1935, following Western Cartridge's acquisition of the Winchester Repeating Arms Company, he was named first vice-president of the merged Winchester-Western and head of the Winchester division. He became president of Olin Industries in 1944 and upon merger of the company with Mathieson Chemical Corporation in 1954 became chairman of the board of the new corporation, named Olin Mathieson Chemical Corporation. Subsequently, the name was shortened to Olin Corporation. Olin retired as chairman of the board in 1957 to become chairman of the executive committee, a position he held until he was elected honorary chairman of the board in 1963.

Olin was an inventor or co-inventor of 24 United States patents in the field of arms and ammunition manufacture and design and was responsible for numerous developments in ballistics.

John Merrill Olin died in 1982 at age 89 at his home in East Hampton, New York.

Thoroughbred horse racing
John and Evelyn Olin bred and raced a number of thoroughbred racehorses, notably winning the 1963 Epsom Oaks with the filly Noblesse, and the 1974 Kentucky Derby with the colt Cannonade.

His granddaughter Adele B. Dilschneider is also a Thoroughbred owner and breeder, whose memberships have included the Kentucky Derby Museum, the Thoroughbred Owners and Breeders Association, the American Horse Council, the Thoroughbred Club of America, and the National Museum of Racing and Hall of Fame.

See also
 John M. Olin Foundation
 John M. Olin Business School
 The Philanthropy Hall of Fame, John Olin

Bibliography

References

1892 births
1982 deaths
People from Alton, Illinois
Cornell University alumni
American chemical engineers
American racehorse owners and breeders
Engineers from Illinois
20th-century American engineers
20th-century American inventors
John M. Olin Foundation
Washington University in St. Louis people
Johns Hopkins University people